Daniel Muñoz-de la Nava and Rubén Ramírez Hidalgo were the defending champions but decided not to participate.
Nikola Ćirić and Boris Pašanski won the title, defeating Stephan Fransen and Jesse Huta Galung 5–7, 6–4, [10–6] in the final.

Seeds

Draw

Draw

References
 Main draw

2012
Doubles